Joel Gregory Mason (March 12, 1912 – October 31, 1995) was a player in the National Football League (NFL) as well as the National Basketball League (NBL).

Professional football and basketball careers
Mason played with the Chicago Cardinals during the 1939 NFL season. After two seasons away from the NFL, he would play four seasons with the Green Bay Packers. During his time with them he was a member of the 1944 NFL Champion Packers. Mason also appeared in one game for the Sheboygan Red Skins in the National Basketball League during the 1942–43 season. He failed to register a statistic in his lone appearance.

He played at the collegiate level at Western Michigan University.

Coaching career
After retiring from professional football, Mason became and assistant football coach at Wayne State University, and soon after became Wayne State's head basketball coach.  Mason coached basketball for 18 years, from 1948 to 1966, winning 186 games and making one NCAA tournament appearance, in 1956. Mason was also the NBL's Detroit Gems during the first half of the 1946–47 season. He resigned, and player Fred Campbell took over to become player-coach.

Head coaching record

References

1912 births
1995 deaths
American football ends
Chicago Cardinals players
Detroit Gems coaches
Green Bay Packers players
Sheboygan Red Skins players
Wayne State Warriors football coaches
Wayne State Warriors men's basketball coaches
Western Michigan Broncos football players
Western Michigan Broncos men's basketball players
People from Iron River, Michigan
Players of American football from Michigan
Basketball players from Michigan
American men's basketball players
Basketball coaches from Michigan